Broadway Teachers Workshop (established in 2001) is a professional development program for theater teachers and academic and community theater directors from all over the world. The three-day conference includes multiple workshops, master classes with Broadway artists, and viewings of Broadway shows. The program, run by co-artistic directors Gordon Greenberg and Pam Pariseau, is designed to instruct and inspire teachers and directors of middle school, high school, university, and community theater and arts with new teaching methods, enhanced production skills, and an exchange of ideas with peers and professional Broadway artists.

Participants from the Broadway community 

 Lynn Ahrens
 Gaby Alter
 Charlie Alterman
 Angelina Avallon
 Hunter Bell
 Nell Benjamin
 Ken Billington
 Rob Bissinger
 Susan Blackwell
 Walter Bobbie
 Steven Booth
 Jason Robert Brown
 Catherine Brunell
 Tituss Burgess
 Haven Burton
 Paul Castree
 Donna Lynne Champlin
 Chuck Cooper
 Eden Espinosa
 Kathy Fitzgerald
 Peter Fitzgerald
 Stephen Flaherty
 David Foubert
 Christopher Gattelli
 Zina Goldrich
 Kate Grant
 Terry Greiss
 Kimberly Grigsby
 Mark Hartman
 Marcy Heisler
 Tina Howe
 Dennis Jones
 Tom Kitt
 David Larsen
 Kecia Lewis
 Bobby Lopez
 Brian MacDevitt
 Lauren Marcus
 Jeff Marks
 Kathleen Marshall
 Bob Martin
 Paul Masse
 Michael Mayer
 Kevin McCollum
 Kevin Moriarty
 Christine Noll
 Marsha Norman
 Laurence O'Keefe
 Stephen Oremus
 Erin Ortman
 Brad Oscar
 Benj Pasek
 Michael Passaro
 Jayne Paterson
 Justin Paul
 Jessica Phillips
 Larry Pressgrove
 Josh Rhodes
 Alice Ripley
 Tory Ross
 Stephen Schwartz
 Jeffery Seller
 Janet Smith
 Bobby Spencer
 Joe Stein
 Jeanine Tesori
 Alex Timbers
 Tony Walton
 Doug West
 Kate Whoriskey
 Jason Williams
 Peter Wolf
 Eric Woodall
 John Lloyd Young

Classes taught 

 Master classes with Tony Award winners and nominees including: 
 Lynne Ahrens and Stephen Flaherty, writing team for Seussical, Ragtime, Once on this Island
 Kathleen Marshall, director/choreographer of Grease, Wonderful Town, The Pajama Game
 Jeanine Tesori, composer for Shrek the Musical, Thoroughly Modern Millie, Caroline or Change
 Ken Billington, lighting designer for over 80 Broadway shows, including Chicago, The Drowsey Chaperone, Fiddler on the Roof
 Stephen Schwartz, composer for Wicked, Pippin, Godspell
 Joe Stein, author of Fiddler on the Roof
 Michael Mayer, director of Spring Awakening
 Alice Ripley, performer in Next to Normal, Side Show, The Rocky Horror Show, Sunset Boulevard, and The Who's Tommy
 Die Vampires, Die creativity workshop with Title of Show cast member Susan Blackwell
 Spiderman workshop with musical director Kim Grigsby and associate scenic designer Rob Bissinger 
 Choreography creation for non-dancers 
 Directing techniques
 Text analysis
 Makeup
 Technical Production 
 Stage Combat
 Fundraising and marketing
 Guide to career and educational paths from high school to Broadway

References
 http://www.broadwayteachersworkshop.com/
 http://nymag.com/daily/intel/2008/07/high_school_musical_when_your.html
 http://mtiblog.mtishows.com/?p=598
 https://web.archive.org/web/20090601171707/http://mtiblog.mtishows.com/?p=843
 https://web.archive.org/web/20090602233623/http://mtiblog.mtishows.com/?p=699

Theatrical organizations in the United States
Educational institutions established in 2001
2001 establishments in the United States